New China Life Insurance Co., Ltd. also known as New China Insurance (NCI) or Xinhua Baoxian Jituan is a Chinese life insurance company based in Beijing. The Chinese government owns more than half of the shares of the company via sovereign fund Central Huijin, via state-owned enterprise Baosteel Group and a financial service company China Securities Finance.

The company is a constituent of stock market indice SSE 50 Index (blue chip of Shanghai Stock Exchange), CSI 300 Index, FTSE China A50 Index and Hang Seng China Enterprises Index.

The company was ranked 427th in 2016 Fortune Global 500 and 297th in 2016 Forbes Global 2000.

Equity investments
The company invested the premium received to several publicly traded company of China, notably Hikvision (0.51% stake in 2015), Industrial Bank (0.21% stake in 2015) and Tianqi Lithium (5.20% stake in 2015).

Shareholders
Top 10 shareholders

 State Council of the People's Republic of China (47.36%, as A shares)
 Central Huijin Investment (32.25%, as A shares)
 China Baowu Steel Group (15.11%, as A shares)
 Swiss Re (4.90%, as H shares)
 Fosun International (3.28%, as H shares)
 China Securities Finance (2.70%, as A shares)
 BlackRock (1.92%, as H shares)
 Beijing Taiji Huaqing Information System (0.71%, as A shares)
 Tibet Shannan Xinshang Investment Management (0.36%, as A shares)
 HFT Investment Management – Agricultural Bank of China – Huaneng Guicheng Trust: No.3 Assembled Funds Trust Plan of HFT Securities Investment (0.24%, as A shares)
 Industrial and Commercial Bank of China: Harvest New Opportunity Flexible Allocation Mixed Launched Securities Investment Fund (0.23%, as A shares)
Note: As all the H shares were held by a proxy: HKSCC Nominees Limited, as well the threshold to disclose the share holding was 5% (of total H shares capital), the list may incomplete.

References

External links
 

Companies listed on the Shanghai Stock Exchange
Companies in the CSI 100 Index
Companies in the Hang Seng China Enterprises Index
Companies listed on the Hong Kong Stock Exchange
Insurance companies of China
Companies based in Beijing
Financial services companies established in 1996
H shares
Chinese brands
Chinese companies established in 1996
Baowu
Government-owned companies of China
China Investment Corporation
Government-owned insurance companies